The dinar (paucal: dinara / динара; abbreviation: DIN (Latin) and дин (Cyrillic); code: RSD) is the currency of Serbia. One dinar is subdivided into 100 para. The dinar was first used in Serbia in medieval times, its earliest use dating back to 1214. Serbian dinar was reintroduced as the official Serbian currency by prince Mihailo Obrenović in the 19th century.

Medieval dinar

The first mention of a "Serbian dinar" dates back to the reign of Stefan Nemanjić in 1214. Until the fall of Despot Stjepan Tomašević in 1459, most of the Serbian rulers minted silver dinar coins. 
The first Serbian dinars, like many other south-European coins, replicated Venetian grosso, including characters in Latin (the word 'Dux' replaced with the word 'Rex'). It was one of the main export articles of medieval Serbia for many years, considering the relative abundance of silver coming from Serbian mines. Venetians were wary of this, and Dante Alighieri went so far as to put the Serbian king of his time, Stephen Uroš II Milutin of Serbia, in Hell as a forger (along with his Portuguese and Norwegian counterparts):

First modern dinar (1868–1920)
Following the Ottoman conquest, different foreign currencies were used up to the mid 19th century. The Ottomans operated coin mints in Novo Brdo, Kučajna and Belgrade. The subdivision of the dinar, the para, is named after the Turkish silver coins of the same name (from the Persian  pāra, "money, coin"). 
After the Principality of Serbia was formally established (1817), there were many different foreign coins in circulation. Eventually, Prince Miloš Obrenović decided to introduce some order by establishing exchange rates based on the groat (Serbian groš, French and English piastre, Turkish kuruş) as money of account. In 1819 Miloš published a table rating 43 different foreign coins: 10 gold, 28 silver, and 5 copper.

After the last Ottoman garrisons were withdrawn in 1867, Serbia was faced with multiple currencies in circulation. Thus, the prince Mihailo Obrenović ordered a national currency be minted. 
The first bronze coins were introduced in 1868, followed by silver in 1875 and gold in 1879. The first banknotes were issued in 1876. Between 1873 and 1894, the dinar was pegged at par to the French franc. The Kingdom of Serbia also joined the Latin Monetary Union.

In 1920, the Serbian dinar was replaced at par by the Yugoslav dinar, with the Yugoslav krone also circulating together.

Coins
In 1868, bronze coins were introduced in denominations of 1, 5, and 10 paras. The obverses featured the portrait of Prince Mihailo Obrenović III. Silver coins were introduced in 1875, in denominations of 50 paras, 1 and 2 dinars, followed by 5 dinars in 1879. The first gold coins were also issued in 1879, for 20 dinars, with 10 dinars introduced in 1882. The gold coins issued for the coronation of Milan I coronation in 1882 were popularly called milandor (French Milan d'Or). In 1883, cupro-nickel 5, 10, and 20 para coins were introduced, followed by bronze 2 para coins in 1904.

Banknotes
In 1876, state notes were introduced in denominations of 1, 5, 10, 50, and 100 dinars. The Chartered National Bank followed these notes from 1884, with notes for 10 dinars backed by silver and gold notes for 50 and 100 dinars. Gold notes for 20 dinars and silver notes for 100 dinars were introduced in 1905. During World War I, silver notes for 50 and 5 dinars were introduced in 1914 and 1916, respectively. In 1915, stamps were authorized for circulation as currency in denominations of 5, 10, 15, 20, 25, 30, and 50 paras.

Second modern dinar (1941–1944)
In 1941, the Yugoslav dinar was replaced, at par, by a second Serbian dinar for use in the German occupied Serbia. The dinar was pegged to the German reichsmark at a rate of 250 dinars = 1 reichsmark. This dinar circulated until 1944, when the Yugoslav dinar was reintroduced by the Yugoslav Partisans, replacing the Serbian dinar rate of 1 Yugoslav dinar = 20 Serbian dinars.

Coins
In 1942, zinc coins were introduced in denominations of 50 paras, 1 and 2 dinars, with 10 dinar coins following in 1943.

Banknotes
In May 1941, the Serbian National Bank introduced notes for 10, 20, 50, 100, 500, and 1,000 dinars. The 100 and 1,000 dinar notes were overprints, whilst the 10 dinar design was taken from an earlier Yugoslav note. Other notes were introduced in 1942 and 1943 without any new denominations being introduced.

Third modern dinar (2003–present)
The Serbian dinar replaced the Yugoslav dinar in 2003 when the Federal Republic of Yugoslavia was transformed into the State Union of Serbia and Montenegro. Both Montenegro and the disputed territory of Kosovo had already adopted the Deutschmark and later the euro when the mark was replaced by it in 2002. The Serbs in North Kosovo and the enclaves within it continue to use the dinar.

Between 2003 and 2006, the Serbian dinar used the ISO 4217 code CSD, with CS being the ISO 3166-1 country code for Serbia and Montenegro. When the State Union was dissolved in 2006, the dinar's ISO 4217 code was changed to the current RSD.

Coins
All coins feature identical inscriptions in Serbian, using the Cyrillic and Latin scripts. The  and  coins are uncommon in circulation, as banknotes of the same value are used instead.

Banknotes

See also
 Economy of Serbia
 Yugoslav dinar
 Yugoslav krone

Notes

References

Sources

External links

 

Circulating currencies
Currencies of Europe
Economy of Serbia
Currencies of Serbia
Currency symbols
Currencies introduced in 2003
2003 establishments in Serbia and Montenegro